I Just Dropped by to Say Hello is a studio album by jazz singer Johnny Hartman, released by Impulse! Records in 1964. It was Hartman's second and next-to-last album on Impulse!, after his highly successful collaboration with John Coltrane which produced John Coltrane and Johnny Hartman, recorded a few months earlier.

Track listing
"Charade (from Charade)" (Henry Mancini, Johnny Mercer) – 2:38
"In the Wee Small Hours of the Morning" (Bob Hilliard, David Mann) – 2:49
"A Sleepin' Bee" (Harold Arlen, Truman Capote) – 2:15
"Don't You Know I Care (Or Don't You Care to Know)" (Mack David, Duke Ellington) – 4:14
"Kiss & Run" (Rene Denoncin, William Engvick, Jack Ledru) – 3:35
"If I'm Lucky" (Eddie DeLange, Josef Myrow) – 2:52
"I Just Dropped by to Say Hello" (Sid Feller, Rick Ward) – 4:10
"Stairway to the Stars" (Matty Malneck, Mitchell Parish, Frank Signorelli) – 3:09
"Our Time" (Stanley Glick, Johnny Hartman) – 3:00
"Don't Call It Love" (Ronnell Bright) – 2:07
"How Sweet It Is to Be in Love" (George Cardini, Danny DiMinno) – 2:20

Tracks 1, 6 recorded on October 9, 1963; the remainder on October 17, 1963.

Personnel
Johnny Hartman - vocals
Illinois Jacquet - tenor saxophone
Kenny Burrell - guitar (tracks 2-5, 7-11)
Jim Hall - guitar (tracks 1, 6)
Hank Jones - piano
Milt Hinton - double bass
Elvin Jones - drums

References 

1964 albums
Johnny Hartman albums
Albums produced by Bob Thiele
Impulse! Records albums